Anarchy, State, and Utopia is a 1974 book by the American political philosopher Robert Nozick. It won the 1975 US National Book Award in category Philosophy and Religion, has been translated into 11 languages, and was named one of the "100 most influential books since the war" (1945–1995) by the UK Times Literary Supplement.

In opposition to A Theory of Justice (1971) by John Rawls, and in debate with Michael Walzer, Nozick argues in favor of a minimal state, "limited to the narrow functions of protection against force, theft, fraud, enforcement of contracts, and so on." When a state takes on more responsibilities than these, Nozick argues, rights will be violated. To support the idea of the minimal state, Nozick presents an argument that illustrates how the minimalist state arises naturally from a Lockean state of nature and how any expansion of state power past this minimalist threshold is unjustified.

Summary
Nozick's entitlement theory, which sees humans as ends in themselves and justifies redistribution of goods only on condition of consent, is a key aspect of Anarchy, State, and Utopia. It is influenced by John Locke, Immanuel Kant, and Friedrich Hayek.

The book also contains a vigorous defense of minarchist libertarianism against more extreme views, such as anarcho-capitalism (in which there is no state and individuals must contract with private companies for all social services). Nozick argues that anarcho-capitalism would inevitably transform into a minarchist state, even without violating any of its own non-aggression principles, through the eventual emergence of a single locally dominant private defense and judicial agency that it is in everyone's interests to align with because other agencies are unable to effectively compete against the advantages of the agency with majority coverage. Therefore, even to the extent that the anarcho-capitalist theory is correct, it results in a single, private, protective agency that is itself a de facto "state". Thus anarcho-capitalism may only exist for a limited period before a minimalist state emerges.

Philosophical activity
The preface of Anarchy, State, and Utopia contains a passage about "the usual manner of presenting philosophical work"—i.e., its presentation as though it were the absolute final word on its subject. Nozick believes that philosophers are really more modest than that and aware of their works' weaknesses. Yet a form of philosophical activity persists which "feels like pushing and shoving things to fit into some fixed perimeter of specified shape." The bulges are masked or the cause of the bulge is thrown far away so that no one will notice. Then "Quickly, you find an angle from which everything appears to fit perfectly and take a snapshot, at a fast shutter speed before something else bulges out too noticeably." After a trip to the darkroom for touching up, "[a]ll that remains is to publish the photograph as a representation of exactly how things are, and to note how nothing fits properly into any other shape." So how does Nozick's work differ from this form of activity? He believed that what he said was correct, but he does not mask the bulges: "the doubts and worries and uncertainties as well as the beliefs, convictions, and arguments."

Why state-of-nature theory?
In this chapter, Nozick tries to explain why investigating a Lockean state of nature is useful in order to understand whether there should be a state in the first place. If one can show that an anarchic society is worse than one that has a state we should choose the second as the less bad alternative. To convincingly compare the two, he argues, one should focus not on an extremely pessimistic nor on an extremely optimistic view of that society. Instead, one should:

Nozick's plan is to first describe the morally permissible and impermissible actions in such a non-political society and how violations of those constraints by some individuals would lead to the emergence of a state. If that would happen, it would explain the appearance even if no state actually developed in that particular way.

He gestures towards perhaps the biggest bulge when he notes (in Chapter 1, "Why State-of-Nature Theory?") the shallowness of his "invisible hand" explanation of the minimal state, deriving it from a Lockean state of nature, in which there are individual rights but no state to enforce and adjudicate them. Although this counts for him as a "fundamental explanation" of the political realm because the political is explained in terms of the nonpolitical, it is shallow relative to his later "genealogical" ambition (in The Nature of Rationality and especially in Invariances) to explain both the political and the moral by reference to beneficial cooperative practices that can be traced back to our hunter-gatherer ancestors and beyond. The genealogy will give Nozick an explanation of what is only assumed in Anarchy, State, and Utopia: the fundamental status of individual rights. Creativity was not a factor in his interpretation.

The state of nature
Nozick starts this chapter by summarizing some of the features of the Lockean state of nature. An important one is that every individual has a right to exact compensation by himself whenever another individual violates his rights. Punishing the offender is also acceptable, but only inasmuch as he (or others) will be prevented from doing that again. As Locke himself acknowledges, this raises several problems, and Nozick is going to try to see to what extent can they be solved by voluntary arrangements. A rational response to the "troubles" of a Lockean state of nature is the establishment of mutual-protection associations, in which all will answer the call of any member. It is inconvenient that everyone is always on call, and that the associates can be called out by members who may be "cantankerous or paranoid". Another important inconvenience takes place when two members of the same association have a dispute. Although there are simple rules that could solve this problem (for instance, a policy of non-intervention), most people will prefer associations that try to build systems to decide whose claims are correct.

In any case, the problem of everybody being on call dictates that some entrepreneurs will go into the business of selling protective services (division of labor). This will lead ("through market pressures, economies of scale, and rational self-interest") to either people joining the strongest association in a given area or that some associations will have similar power and hence will avoid the costs of fighting by agreeing to a third party that would act as a judge or court to solve the disputes. But for all practical purposes, this second case is equivalent to having just one protective association. And this is something "very much resembling a minimal state". Nozick judges that Locke was wrong to imagine a social contract as necessary to establish civil society and money. He prefers invisible-hand explanations, that is to say, that voluntary agreements between individuals create far-reaching patterns that look like they were designed when in fact nobody did. These explanations are useful in the sense that they "minimize the use of notions constituting the phenomena to be explained".
So far he has shown that such an "invisible hand" would lead to a dominant association, but individuals may still justly enforce their own rights. But this protective agency is not yet a state. At the end of the chapter Nozick points out some of the problems of defining what a state is, but he says:

The protective agencies so far do not make any such announcement. Furthermore, it does not offer the same degree of protection to all its clients (who may purchase different degrees of coverage) and the individuals who do not purchase the service (the "independents") do not get any protection at all, (spillover effects aside). This goes against our experience with states, where even tourists typically receive protection. Therefore, the dominant protective agency lacks a monopoly on the use of force and fails to protect all people inside its territory.

Moral constraints and the state
Nozick arrives at the night-watchman state of classical liberalism theory by showing that there are non-redistributive reasons for the apparently redistributive procedure of making its clients pay for the protection of others. He defines what he calls an ultraminimal state, which would not have this seemingly redistributive feature but would be the only one allowed to enforce rights. Proponents of this ultraminimal state do not defend it on the grounds of trying to minimize the total of (weighted) violations of rights (what he calls utilitarianism of rights.) That idea would mean, for example, that someone could punish another person they know to be innocent in order to calm down a mob that would otherwise violate even more rights. This is not the philosophy behind the ultraminimal state. Instead, its proponents hold its members' rights are a side-constraint on what can be done to them. This side-constraint view reflects the underlying Kantian principle that individuals are ends and not merely means, so the rights of one individual cannot be violated to avoid violations of the rights of other people. Which principle should we choose, then? Nozick will not try to prove which one is better. Instead, he gives some reasons to prefer the Kantian view and later points to problems with classic utilitarianism.

The first reason he gives in favor of the Kantian principle is that the analogy between the individual case (in which we choose to sacrifice now for a greater benefit later) and the social case (in which we sacrifice the interests of one individual for the greater social good) is incorrect:

A second reason focuses on the non-aggression principle. Are we prepared to dismiss this principle? That is, can we accept that some individuals may harm some innocent in certain cases? (This non-aggression principle does not include, of course, self-defense and perhaps some other special cases he points out.)

He then goes on to expose some problems with utilitarianism by discussing whether animals should be taken into account in the utilitarian calculation of happiness, if that depends on the kind of animal, if killing them painlessly would be acceptable, and so on. He believes that utilitarianism is not appropriate even with animals.

But Nozick's most famous argument for the side-constraint view against classical utilitarianism and the idea that only felt experience matters is his Experience Machine thought experiment. It induces whatever illusory experience one might wish, but it prevents the subject from doing anything or making contact with anything. There is only pre-programmed neural stimulation sufficient for the illusion. Nozick pumps the intuition that each of us has a reason to avoid plugging into the Experience Machine forever. This is not to say that "plugging in" might not be the best all-things-considered choice for some who are terminally ill and in great pain. The point of the thought experiment is to articulate a weighty reason not to plug in, a reason that should not be there if all that matters is felt experience.

Prohibition, compensation, and risk
The procedure that leads to a night-watchman state involves compensation to non-members who are prevented from enforcing their rights, an enforcement mechanism that it deems risky by comparison with its own. Compensation addresses any disadvantages non-members suffer as a result of being unable to enforce their rights. Assuming that non-members take reasonable precautions and adjusting activities to the association's prohibition of their enforcing their own rights, the association is required to raise the non-member above his actual position by an amount equal to the difference between his position on an indifference curve he would occupy were it not for the prohibition, and his original position.

The purpose of this comparatively dense chapter is to deduce what Nozick calls the Compensation Principle. That idea is going to be key for the next chapter, where he shows how (without any violation of rights) an ultraminimal state (one that has a monopoly of enforcement of rights) can become a minimal state (which also provides protection to all individuals). Since this would involve some people paying for the protection of others, or some people being forced to pay for protection, the main element of the discussion is whether these kinds of actions can be justified from a natural rights perspective. Hence the development of a theory of compensation in this chapter.

He starts by asking broadly what if someone "crosses a boundary" (for instance, physical harm.) If this is done with the consent of the individual concerned, no problem arises. Unlike Locke, Nozick does not have a "paternalistic" view of the matter. He believes anyone can do anything to himself, or allow others to do the same things to him.

But what if B crosses A's boundaries without consent? Is that okay if A is compensated?

What Nozick understands by compensation is anything that makes A indifferent (that is, A has to be just as good in his own judgement before the transgression and after the compensation) provided that A has taken reasonable precautions to avoid the situation. He argues that compensation is not enough, because some people will violate these boundaries, for example, without revealing their identity. Therefore, some extra cost has to be imposed on those who violate someone else's rights. (For the sake of simplicity this discussion on deterrence is summarized in another section of this article).

After discussing the issue of punishment and concluding that not all violations of rights will be deterred under a retributive theory of justice, (which he favors) Nozick returns to compensation. Again, why don't we allow anyone to do anything provided they give full compensation afterwards? There are several problems with that view.

Firstly, if some person gets a big gain by violating another's rights and they then compensates the victim up to the point where they are indifferent, the infractor is getting all the benefits that this provides. But one could argue that it would be fair for the felon to give some compensation beyond that, just like in the marketplace, where the buyer does not necessarily just pay up to the point where the seller is indifferent from selling or not selling. There is usually room for negotiation, which raises the question of fairness. Every attempt to make a theory of a fair price in the marketplace has failed, and Nozick prefers not to try to solve the issue. Instead, he says that, whenever possible, those negotiations should take place, so that the compensation is decided by the people involved. But when one cannot negotiate, it is unclear whether all acts should be accepted if compensation is paid.

Secondly, allowing anything if compensation is paid makes all people fearful. Nozick argues that if one knows that they will have their rights violated and then be compensated for it; they will still be fearful. This raises important problems:
 How will financial compensation make the assaulters pay not only for the damage but also for the fear that the assaulted had before that will not do, as the assaulter is not the only responsible of that fear.
 If that was the way to compensate, non-assaulted people would be left uncompensated for the fear they have.
 One cannot compensate anyone for fear after the fact because we remember the fear we had as less important than it actually was. Because of that, what should be calculated instead is what Nozick calls "Market Compensation", which is the compensation that would be agreed upon if the negotiations took place before the fact. But this is impossible, according to Nozick.

The conclusion of these difficulties, particularly the last one, is that anything that produces general fear may be prohibited. Another reason to prohibit is that it would imply using people as a means, which violates the Kantian principle that he defended earlier.

But if so, what about prohibiting all boundary crossing that isn't consented in advance? That would solve the fear problem, but it would be way too restrictive, since people may cross some boundaries by accident, unintentional acts, etc.) and the costs of getting that consent may be too high (for instance if the known victim is on a trip in the jungle). What then? "The most efficient policy forgoes the fewest net beneficial acts; it allows anyone to perform an unfeared action without prior agreement, provided the transaction costs of reaching a prior agreement are greater, even by a bit, than the costs of the posterior compensation process."

Note that a particular action may not cause fear if it has a low probability of causing harm. But when all the risky activities are added up, the probability of being harmed may be high. This poses the problem that prohibiting all such activities (which may be very varied) is too restrictive. The obvious response, that is, establishing a threshold value V such that there is a violation of rights if  (where p is the probability of harming and H is the amount of harm that could be done) will not fit a natural-rights position. In his own words:

Granted, some insurance solutions will work in these cases and he discusses some. But what should be done to people who do not have the means to buy insurance or compensate other people for the risks of his actions? Should they be forbidden from doing it?

(This is going to have important consequences in the next chapter, see next section).

Nozick's conclusion is to prohibit specially dangerous actions that are generally done and compensating the specially disadvantaged individual from the prohibition. This is what he calls the Principle of Compensation. For example, it is allowed to forbid epileptics from driving, but only if they are compensated exactly for the costs that the disadvantaged has to assume (chauffeurs, taxis). This would only take place if the benefit from the increased security outweighs these costs. But this is not a negotiation. The analogy he gives is blackmail: it is not right to pay a person or group to prevent him from doing something that otherwise would give him no benefit whatsoever. Nozick considers such transactions as "unproductive activities". Similarly, (it should be deduced) it is not right for the epileptic to negotiate a payment for not doing something risky to other people.

However, Nozick does point to some problems with this principle. Firstly, he says that the action has to be "generally done". The intention behind that qualification is that eccentric and dangerous activities should not be compensated. His extreme example is someone who has fun playing Russian roulette with the head of others without asking them. Such action must be prohibited, with no qualifications. But one can define anything as a "generally done" action. The Russian roulette could be considered "having fun" and hence be compensated. Secondly, if the special and dangerous action is the only way a person can do something important to him (for instance, if it is the only way one can have fun or support himself) then perhaps it should be compensated. Thirdly, more generally, he recognizes he does not have a theory of disadvantage, so it is unclear what counts as a "special disadvantage".

This has to be further developed, because in the state of nature there is no authority to decide how to define these terms (see the discussion of a similar issue in p. 89).

The state
An independent might be prohibited from using his methods of privately enforcing justice if:
 His method is too risky (“perhaps he consults tea leaves”)
 He uses a method of unknown riskiness.
Nevertheless, an independent may be using a method that does not impose a high risk on others but, if similar procedures are used by many others the total risk may go beyond an acceptable threshold. In that case it is impossible to decide who should stop doing it, since nobody is personally responsible and therefore nobody has a right to stop him. Independents may get together to decide these questions, but even if they agree to a mechanism to keep the total risk below the threshold, each individual will have an incentive to get out of the deal. This procedure fails because of the rationality of being a free rider on such grouping, taking advantage of everyone else's restraint and going ahead with one's own risky activities. In a famous discussion he rejects H. L. A. Hart's "principle of fairness" for dealing with free riders, which would morally bind them to cooperative practices from which they benefit. One may not charge and collect for benefits one bestows without prior agreement. But Nozick refutes this.

If the principle of fairness does not work, how should we decide this? Natural law tradition does not help much in clarifying what procedural rights we have. Nozick assumes that we all have a right to know that we are being applied a fair and reliable method for deciding if we are guilty. If this information is not available publicly, we have a right to resist. We may also do it if we find this procedure unreliable or unfair after considering the information given. We may not even participate in the process, even if it would be advisable to do so.

The application of these rights may be delegated to the protective agency, which will prevent others from applying methods of which it finds unacceptable in terms of reliability or fairness. Presumably, it would publish a list of accepted methods. Anyone who violates this prohibition will be punished. Every individual has a right to do this, and other companies could try to enter the business, but the dominant protective agency is the only one that has the power to actually carry out this prohibition. It is the only one that can guarantee its clients that no unaccepted procedure will be applied to them.

But there is another important difference: the protective agency, in doing this, can put some independents in a situation of disadvantage. Specifically, those independents who use a prohibited method and cannot afford its services without great effort (or are even too poor to pay no matter what). These people will be at the expense of paying clients of the agency.

In the previous chapter we saw that it was necessary to compensate others for the disadvantages imposed on them. We also saw that this compensation would amount only to the extra cost imposed to the disadvantaged beyond the costs that he would otherwise incur (in this case, the costs of the risky/unknown procedure he would want to apply). Nevertheless, it would amount to even the full price of a simple protection policy if the independent is unable to pay for it after the compensation for the disadvantages.

Also, the protective services that count here are strictly against paying clients, because these are the ones against whom the independent was defenceless in the first place.

But wouldn’t this compensation mechanism generate another free riding problem? Nozick says that not much, because the compensation is only “the amount that would equal the cost of an unfancy policy when added to the sum of the monetary costs of self-help protection plus whatever amount the person comfortably could pay”. Also, as we just said, it is an unfancy policy that protects only against paying clients, not against compensated clients and other independents. Therefore, the more free riders there are, the more important it becomes to buy a full protection policy.

We can see that what we now have resembles a state. In chapter 3 Nozick argued that two necessary conditions to be fulfilled by an organization to be a state were:
 Monopoly of the use of force.
 Universal protection.
The protective agency resembles a state in these two conditions. Firstly, it is a de facto monopoly due to the competitive advantage mentioned earlier. It does not have any special right to be it, it just is.

Secondly, most of the people are its clients. There may be independents, however, who apply procedures it approves of. Also, there might still be independents who apply methods that it disapproves of to other independents with unreliable procedures.

These conditions are important because they are the basis for the “individualist anarchist” to claim that every state is necessarily illegitimate. This part of the book is a refutation of that claim, showing that some states could be formed by a series of legitimate steps. The de facto monopoly has arisen by morally permissible steps and the universal protection, is not really redistributive because the people who are given money or protective services at a discount had a right to this as a compensation for the disadvantages forced upon them. Therefore, the state is not violating anybody’s rights.

Note that this is not a state as we usually understand it. It is presumably organized more like a company and, more importantly, there still exist independents. But, as Nozick says:

He does recognize, however, that this entity does not fit perfectly in the Weberian tradition of the definition of the state. It is not “the sole authorizer of violence”, since some independents may conduct violence to one another without intervention. But it is the sole effective judge over the permissibility of violence. Therefore, he concludes, this may be also called a “statelike entity.”

Finally, Nozick warns us that the step from being just a de facto monopoly (the ultraminimal state) to becoming this “statelike entity” that compensates some independents (the minimal state) is not a necessary one. Compensating is a moral obligation. But this does not invalidate Nozick’s response to the individualist anarchist and it remains an invisible hand explanation: after all, to give universal protection the agency does not need to have any plan to become a state. It just happens if it decides to give the protection it owes.

Further considerations on the argument for the state
A discussion of pre-emptive attack leads Nozick to a principle that excludes prohibiting actions not wrong in themselves, even if those actions make more likely the commission of wrongs later on. This provides him with a significant difference between a protection agency's prohibitions against procedures it deems unreliable or unfair, and other prohibitions that might seem to go too far, such as forbidding others to join another protective agency. Nozick's principle does not disallow others from doing so.

Distributive justice
Nozick's discussion of Rawls's theory of justice raised a prominent dialogue between libertarianism and liberalism. He sketches an entitlement theory, which states, "From each as they choose, to each as they are chosen". It comprises a theory of (1) justice in acquisition; (2) justice in rectification if (1) is violated (rectification which might require apparently redistributive measures); (3) justice in holdings, and (4) justice in transfer. Assuming justice in acquisition, entitlement to holdings is a function of repeated applications of (3) and (4). Nozick's entitlement theory is a non-patterned historical principle. Almost all other principles of distributive justice (egalitarianism, utilitarianism) are patterned principles of justice. Such principles follow the form, "to each according to..."

Nozick's famous Wilt Chamberlain argument is an attempt to show that patterned principles of just distribution are incompatible with liberty. He asks us to assume that the original distribution in society, D1, is ordered by our choice of patterned principle, for instance Rawls's Difference Principle. Wilt Chamberlain is an extremely popular basketball player in this society, and Nozick further assumes 1 million people are willing to freely give Chamberlain 25 cents each to watch him play basketball over the course of a season (we assume no other transactions occur). Chamberlain now has $250,000, a much larger sum than any of the other people in the society. This new distribution in society, call it D2, obviously is no longer ordered by our favored pattern that ordered D1. However Nozick argues that D2 is just. For if each agent freely exchanges some of his D1 share with the basketball player and D1 was a just distribution (we know D1 was just, because it was ordered according to the favored patterned principle of distribution), how can D2 fail to be a just distribution? Thus Nozick argues that what the Wilt Chamberlain example shows is that no patterned principle of just distribution will be compatible with liberty. In order to preserve the pattern, which arranged D1, the state will have to continually interfere with people's ability to freely exchange their D1 shares, for any exchange of D1 shares explicitly involves violating the pattern that originally ordered it.

Nozick analogizes taxation with forced labor, asking the reader to imagine a man who works longer to gain income to buy a movie ticket and a man who spends his extra time on leisure (for instance, watching the sunset). What, Nozick asks, is the difference between seizing the second man's leisure (which would be forced labor) and seizing the first man's goods? "Perhaps there is no difference in principle," Nozick concludes, and notes that the argument could be extended to taxation on other sources besides labor. "End-state and most patterned principles of distributive justice institute (partial) ownership by others of people and their actions and labor. These principles involve a shift from the classical liberals' notion of self ownership to a notion of (partial) property rights in other people."

Nozick then briefly considers Locke's theory of acquisition. After considering some preliminary objections, he "adds an additional bit of complexity" to the structure of the entitlement theory by refining Locke's proviso that "enough and as good" must be left in common for others by one's taking property in an unowned object. Nozick favors a "Lockean proviso" that forbids appropriation when the position of others is thereby worsened. For instance, appropriating the only water hole in a desert and charging monopoly prices would not be legitimate. But in line with his endorsement of the historical principle, this argument does not apply to the medical researcher who discovers a cure for a disease and sells for whatever price he will. Nor does Nozick provide any means or theory whereby abuses of appropriation—acquisition of property when there is not enough and as good in common for others—should be corrected.

The Difference Principle
Nozick attacks John Rawls's Difference Principle on the ground that the well-off could threaten a lack of social cooperation to the worse-off, just as Rawls implies that the worse-off will be assisted by the well-off for the sake of social cooperation. Nozick asks why the well-off would be obliged, due to their inequality and for the sake of social cooperation, to assist the worse-off and not have the worse-off accept the inequality and benefit the well-off. Furthermore, Rawls's idea regarding morally arbitrary natural endowments comes under fire; Nozick argues that natural advantages that the well-off enjoy do not violate anyone's rights and that, therefore, the well-off have a right to them. He also states that Rawls's proposal that inequalities be geared toward assisting the worse-off is morally arbitrary in itself.

Original position
Nozick's opinions on historical entitlement ensures that he naturally rejects the Original Position since he argues that in the Original Position individuals will use an end-state principle to determine the outcome, whilst he explicitly states the importance of the historicity of any such decisions (for example punishments and penalties will require historical information).

Equality, Envy, Exploitation, Etc.
Nozick presses "the major objection" to theories that bestow and enforce positive rights to various things such as equality of opportunity, life, and so on. "These 'rights' require a substructure of things and materials and actions," he writes, "and 'other' people may have rights and entitlements over these."

Nozick concludes that "Marxian exploitation is the exploitation of people's lack of understanding of economics."

Demoktesis
Demoktesis is a thought-experiment designed to show the incompatibility of democracy with libertarianism in general and the entitlement theory specifically. People desirous of more money might "hit upon the idea of incorporating themselves, raising money by selling shares in themselves." They would partition such rights as which occupation one would have. Though perhaps no one sells himself into utter slavery, there arises through voluntary exchanges a "very extensive domination" of some person by others. This intolerable situation is avoided by writing new terms of incorporation that for any stock no one already owning more than a certain number of shares may purchase it. As the process goes on, everyone sells off rights in themselves, "keeping one share in each right as their own, so they can attend stockholders' meetings if they wish." The inconvenience of attending such meetings leads to a special occupation of stockholders' representative. There is a great dispersal of shares such that almost everybody is deciding about everybody else. The system is still unwieldy, so a "great consolidational convention" is convened for buying and selling shares, and after a "hectic three days (lo and behold!)" each person owns exactly one share in each right over every other person, including himself. So now there can be just one meeting in which everything is decided for everybody. Attendance is too great and it's boring, so it is decided that only those entitled to cast at least 100,000 votes may attend the grand stockholders' meeting. And so on. Their social theorists call the system demoktesis (from Greek δῆμος demos, "people" and κτῆσις ktesis, "ownership"), "ownership of the people, by the people, and for the people", and declare it the highest form of social life, one that must not be allowed to perish from the earth. With this "eldritch tale" we have in fact arrived at a modern democratic state.

A Framework for Utopia
The utopia mentioned in the title of Nozick's first book is a meta-utopia, a framework for voluntary migration between utopias tending towards worlds in which everybody benefits from everybody else's presence. This is meant to be the Lockean "night-watchman state" writ large. The state protects individual rights and makes sure that contracts and other market transactions are voluntary. The meta-utopian framework reveals what is inspiring and noble in this night-watchman function. They both contain the only form of social union that is possible for the atomistic rational agents of Anarchy, State, and Utopia, fully voluntary associations of mutual benefit. The influence of this idea on Nozick's thinking is profound. Even in his last book, Invariances, he is still concerned to give priority to the mutual-benefit aspect of ethics. This coercively enforceable aspect ideally has an empty core in the game theorists' sense: the core of a game is all of those payoff vectors to the group wherein no subgroup can do better for itself acting on its own, without cooperating with others not in the subgroup. The worlds in Nozick's meta-utopia have empty cores. No subgroup of a utopian world is better off to emigrate to its own smaller world. The function of ethics is fundamentally to create and stabilize such empty cores of mutually beneficial cooperation. His view is that we are fortunate to live under conditions that favor "more-extensive cores", and less conquest, slavery, and pillaging, "less imposition of noncore vectors upon subgroups." Higher moral goals are real enough, but they are parasitic (as described in The Examined Life, the chapter "Darkness and Light") upon mutually beneficial cooperation.

In Nozick's utopia if people are not happy with the society they are in they can leave and start their own community, but he fails to consider that there might be things that prevent a person from leaving or moving about freely. Thomas Pogge states that items that are not socially induced can restrict people's options. Nozick states that for the healthy to have to support the handicapped imposes on their freedom, but Pogge argues that it introduces an inequality. This inequality restricts movement based on the ground rules Nozick has implemented, which could lead to feudalism and slavery, a society which Nozick himself would reject. David Schaefer notes that Nozick himself claims that a person could sell himself into slavery, which would break the very ground rule that was created, restricting the movement and choices that a person could make.

Other topics covered in the book

Retributive and deterrence theories of punishment
In chapter 4 Nozick discusses two theories of punishment: the deterrence and the retributive ones. To compare them, we have to take into account what is the decision that a potential infractor is facing. His decision may be determined by:

Where G are the gains from violating the victim's rights, p is the probability of getting caught and (C + D + E) are the costs that the infractor would face if caught. Specifically, C is full compensation to the victim, D are all the emotional costs that the infractor would face if caught (by being apprehended, placed on trial and so on) and E are the financial costs of the processes of apprehension and trial.

So if this equation is positive, the potential infractor will have an incentive to violate the potential victim's rights.

Here the two theories come into play. On a retributive justice framework, an additional cost R should be imposed to the transgressor that is proportional to the harm done (or intended to be done).

Therefore, the decision a potential infractor would now face would be:

But this still will not deter all people. The equation would be positive if G is high enough or, more importantly, if p is low. That is, if it is very unlikely that an infractor will be caught, they may very well choose to do it even if they have to face the new cost R. Therefore, retributive justice theories allow some failures of deterrence.

On the other hand, deterrence theories ("the penalty for a crime should be the minimal one necessary to deter commission of it") do not give enough guidance on how much deterrence should we aim at. If every single possible violation of rights is to be deterred, "the penalty will be set unacceptably high". The problem here is that the infractor may be punished well beyond the harm done to deter other people.

According to Nozick, the utilitarian response to the latest problem would be to raise the penalty until the point where more additional unhappiness would be created than would be saved to those who will not be victimized as a consequence of the additional penalty. But this will not do, according to Nozick, because it raises another problem: should the happiness of the victim have more weight in the calculation than the happiness of the felon? If so, how much?

He concludes that the retributive framework is better on grounds of simplicity.

Similarly, under the retributive theory, he contends that self-defense is appropriate even if the victim uses more force to defend themself. In particular, he proposes that the maximum amount of force that a potential victim can use is:

And in this case H is the harm that the victim thinks that the other is going to inflict upon themself. However, if he uses more force than f(H), that additional force has to be subtracted later from the punishment that the felon gets.

Animal rights and utilitarianism
Nozick discusses in chapter 3 whether animals have rights too or whether they can be used, and if the species of the animal says anything about the extent to which this can be done. He also analyzes the proposal "utilitarianism for animals, Kantianism for people," ultimately rejecting it, saying: "Even for animals, utilitarianism won't do as the whole story, but the thicket of questions daunts us." Here Nozick also espouses ethical vegetarianism, saying: "Though I should say in my view the extra benefits Americans today can gain from eating animals do not justify doing it. So we shouldn't." Philosopher Josh Milburn has argued that Nozick's contributions have been overlooked in the literature on both animal ethics and libertarianism.

Reception

Anarchy, State, and Utopia came out of a semester-long course that Nozick taught with Michael Walzer at Harvard in 1971, called Capitalism and Socialism. The course was a debate between the two; Nozick's side is in Anarchy, State, and Utopia, and Walzer's side is in his Spheres of Justice (1983), in which he argues for "complex equality".

Murray Rothbard, an anarcho-capitalist, criticizes Anarchy, State, and Utopia in his essay "Robert Nozick and the Immaculate Conception of the State" on the basis that:

 No existing state has actually developed by the 'invisible hand' process described by Nozick, and therefore Nozick, on his own grounds, should "advocate anarchism" and then "wait for his State to develop".
 Even if any State had been so conceived, individual rights are inalienable and therefore no existing State could be justified.
 A correct theory of contracts is the title-transfer theory which states that the only valid and enforceable contract is one that surrenders what is, in fact, philosophically alienable, and that only specific titles to property are so alienable. Therefore no one can surrender his own will, his body, other persons, or the rights of his posterity.
 The risk and compensation principles are both fallacious and result in unlimited despotism.
 Compensation, in the theory of punishment, is simply a method of trying to recompense the victim after a crime occurs; it can never justify the initial violation of individual rights.
 Nozick’s theory of “nonproductive” exchanges is invalid since in economic theory all voluntary exchanges are by definition productive, so that the prohibition of "nonproductive" risky activities and hence the ultra-minimal state falls on this account alone.
 Contrary to Nozick, there are no “procedural rights,” and therefore no way to get from his theory of risk and nonproductive exchange to the compulsory monopoly of the ultra-minimal state.
 Nozick’s minimal state would, on his own grounds, justify a maximal State as well.
 The only “invisible hand” process, on Nozick’s own terms, would move society from his minimal State "back to anarchism".

The American legal scholar Arthur Allen Leff criticized Nozick in his 1979 article "Unspeakable Ethics, Unnatural Law". Leff stated that Nozick built his entire book on the bald assertion that "individuals have rights which may not be violated by other individuals", for which no justification is offered. According to Leff, no such justification is possible either. Any desired ethical statement, including a negation of Nozick's position, can easily be "proved" with apparent rigor as long as one takes the licence to simply establish a grounding principle by assertion. Leff further calls "ostentatiously unconvincing" Nozick's proposal that differences among individuals will not be a problem if like-minded people form geographically isolated communities.

Philosopher Jan Narveson described Nozick's book as "brilliant".

Cato Institute fellow Tom G. Palmer writes that Anarchy, State, and Utopia is "witty and dazzling", and offers a strong criticism of John Rawls's A Theory of Justice. Palmer adds that, "Largely because of his remarks on Rawls and the extraordinary power of his intellect, Nozick's book was taken quite seriously by academic philosophers and political theorists, many of whom had not read contemporary libertarian (or classical liberal) material and considered this to be the only articulation of libertarianism available. Since Nozick was writing to defend the limited state and did not justify his starting assumption that individuals have rights, this led some academics to dismiss libertarianism as 'without foundations,' in the words of the philosopher Thomas Nagel. When read in light of the explicit statement of the book's purpose, however, this criticism is misdirected".

Libertarian author David Boaz writes that Anarchy, State, and Utopia, together with Rothbard's For a New Liberty (1973) and Ayn Rand's essays on political philosophy, "defined the 'hard-core' version of modern libertarianism, which essentially restated Spencer's law of equal freedom: Individuals have the right to do whatever they want to do, so long as they respect the equal rights of others."

In the article "Social Unity and Primary Goods", republished in his Collected Papers (1999), Rawls notes that Nozick handles Sen's liberal paradox in a manner that is similar to his own. However, the rights that Nozick takes to be fundamental and the basis for regarding them to be such are different from the equal basic liberties included in justice as fairness and Rawls conjectures that they are thus not inalienable.

In Lectures on the History of Political Philosophy (2007), Rawls notes that Nozick assumes that just transactions are "justice preserving" in much the same way that logical operations are "truth preserving". Thus, as explained in Distributive justice above, Nozick holds that repetitive applications of "justice in holdings" and "justice in transfer" preserve an initial state of justice obtained through "justice in acquisition or rectification". Rawls points out that this is simply an assumption or presupposition and requires substantiation. In reality, he maintains, small inequalities established by just transactions accumulate over time and eventually result in large inequalities and an unjust situation.

See also
 American philosophy
 Constitutional economics
 Liberalism and the Limits of Justice
 Rule according to higher law
 Night-watchman state

References

Bibliography
 Robinson, Dave & Groves, Judy (2003). Introducing Political Philosophy. Icon Books. .
 Nozick, Robert. The Examined Life.

External links
 Rothbard, Murray: Robert Nozick and the Immaculate Conception of the State
 
 A distillation of Jonathan Wolff's criticisms of Nozick
 "The Squirrel and the State" – A Criticism of Nozick's Argument for the State by Nicolás Maloberti (The Independent Review 14.3, 2010) 
 Robert Nozick's Political Philosophy, Stanford Encyclopedia of Philosophy

1974 non-fiction books
American non-fiction books
Basic Books books
Books by Robert Nozick
Books in political philosophy
English-language books
Libertarian books
National Book Award-winning works
Philosophical literature
Works about John Rawls